Shah Cheragh (also Romanized as Shāh Cherāgh) is a village in Marbin-e Vosta Rural District, in the Central District of Khomeyni Shahr County, Isfahan Province, Iran. At the 2006 census, its population was 30, in 10 families.

References 

Populated places in Khomeyni Shahr County